Driving licence in Iran is a document issued by the relevant government agency, regional or local security force, confirming the rights of the holder to drive motor vehicles. 

There are five types of driver's license in Iran: Motorcycles Permit, Third Grade Driver's license, Second Grade Driver's license, First Grade Driver's license and Specific Driver's license. The minimum age for driving in Iran is 18 years old.

Requirements for Iranian citizens
In order to get a licence, applicant must fulfill these requirements:

 Postal Code
 Original and photocopy of national identity card and birth certificate
 Finger print
 Blood group document
 Biometric photo
 Driver's licence card fees
 Health Report (usually eye check)
 Criminal record certificate (for first grade)

Age Requirements for licenses

 Motorcycles Permit - Must be at least 18 years old.
 Third Grade - Must be at least 18 years old.
 Second Grade - Must be at least 23 years old.
 First Grade - Must be at least 25 years old.
 Specific - Must be at least 23 years old.

Requirements for foreigners

The required for international driving license application:

 Valid driving license of I.R.Iran with at least 40 days validity
 Photo copies 3x4 cm full-faced pictures with white background (In case If the picture on the driving license is with glasses these pictures should also be with glasses)

 Previous international driving license (if valid)
 A printed copy of the first page of passport (if holding one)
 Filled-in application form (Persian and English; the English birth date should be stated in A.D.)
 4200000 Rial cash payment per license

Restrictions

Motorcycles Permit  - Motorcycles/Motorized Tricycles 
Third Grade –Motor vehicles with a seating capacity for not more than 9 passengers and vehicle up to 3500 kg Gross Vehicle Weight (private)
Second Grade - Motor vehicles with a seating capacity up to 26 passengers and vehicle up to 6000 kg Gross Vehicle Weight (transportation)
First Grade - Buses and trucks with a capacity over 6000 kg Gross Vehicle Weight 
Specific  - for Crane and similar

See also
Vehicle registration plates of Iran
Iranian national identity card
Iranian passport
Identity documents in Iran

References

External links
 Iran Police + 10 Website
 Touring & Automobile Club Of Iran Website

Iran
Road transport in Iran
Identity documents of Iran